Hershey Center or Hershey Centre could mean:

Hershey Centre, an indoor arena now known as the Paramount Fine Foods Centre, in Mississauga, Ontario, Canada
Hershey Center for Applied Research, a research park in Hershey, Pennsylvania, United States